Diplocalyptis apona is a species of moth of the family Tortricidae. It is found in Nepal and Vietnam.

References

Archipini
Moths of Asia
Moths described in 1976
Taxa named by Alexey Diakonoff